Comfort Avery Adams (November 1, 1868 – February 21, 1958) was an American electrical engineer who as a student helped Albert A. Michelson with the Michelson–Morley experiment (1887), which was later viewed as confirming the special relativity theory of Albert Einstein (1905). He was a recipient of the IEEE Edison Medal and AIEE Lamme Medal.

Biography
Adams was born in Cleveland, Ohio to Comfort Avery Adams Sr. and Katherine Emily Peticolas on November 1, 1868. 

"Doc Adams", as he was commonly addressed by his colleagues and friends, received his Honorary Doctorate of Engineering from his alma mater, Case School of Applied Science, in 1925 after having been on the faculty at Harvard College and dean of their engineering school for almost 35 years.  He later received his second honorary doctorate from Lehigh University in 1939.  By that time he had retired from Harvard.  In terms of an all-around American engineer in the early 20th century, Comfort A. Adams comes the closest to being America's answer to Britain's I. K. Brunel.

Adams was president of the American Institute of Electrical Engineers and the American Welding Society. He organized and chaired the Welding Research Council.

Adams married Elizabeth Chassis Parsons in 1894, and they adopted two children. Adams died at his home in Philadelphia, Pennsylvania on February 21, 1958.

Honors and awards
Fellow of the American Academy of Arts and Sciences (1906)
Honorary Doctor of Engineering from Case School of Applied Science 1925
Honorary Doctor of Engineering from Lehigh University (1939)
Lamme Medalist of the American Institute of Electrical Engineers (1940)
IEEE Edison Medal (1956)
Delivered the first of the series of Adams Lectures founded in his honor by the American Welding Society 
Samuel Wylie Miller Medal of the American Welding Society (first recipient)
Long-time member of the ASME Boiler and Pressure Vessel Committee,  then Honorary Member 
Honorary Member of the International Acetylene Association 
Member of the National Academy of Sciences

Memberships

American Institute of Electrical Engineers
American Society of Mechanical Engineers 
American Society of Civil Engineers 
American Standards Association 
American Engineering Council 
American Society for Metals 
American Society for Testing and Materials 
Society for Promotion of Engineering Education 
American Physical Society 
British Institute of Electrical Engineering 
Verband Deutscher Electrotechniker 
Société Française des Electriciens 
Sigma Xi 
Tau Beta Pi

Club memberships
Harvard Faculty Club, Cambridge, Massachusetts 
Engineers Club, New York 
Engineers' Club of Philadelphia
Cedarbrook Country Club, Blue Bell, Pennsylvania

References

External links
 Biography
National Academy of Sciences Biographical Memoir

1868 births
1958 deaths
American electrical engineers
Scientists from Cleveland
IEEE Edison Medal recipients
Case Western Reserve University alumni
Harvard College faculty
Fellows of the American Academy of Arts and Sciences
Members of the United States National Academy of Sciences
Presidents of the IEEE
IEEE Lamme Medal recipients
Engineers from Ohio